Lynn Abrams  is a historian and Professor of History at the University of Glasgow, and a Fellow of the British Academy (2018). She is Chair in Modern History at the University of Glasgow, where her research and teaching interests include the history of women and gender relations in Britain, and oral history.

Career 
Abrams has published widely in academic journals and edited volumes, and has published five books, including two on oral history theory.

Between 2010 and 2016, she was co-editor of the journal Gender & History, along with Dr Alexandra Shepard and Professor Eleanor Gordon also of the University of Glasgow. She was convenor of Women's History Scotland from 2008 to 2013, which aims to promote study and research in women's and gender history.

She coordinated the public event Reinventing Scotland's Woollen Traditions in Glasgow in 2012, which explored the history and influence of knitting on Scotland, as well as the impact of it resurgence in popularity on Scotland's creative industries and tourism.

In 2013, her research study on masculinity in Highland men between 1760 and 1840 was subject to media attention, when it received criticism from Gaelic writer Angus Peter Campbell. Abrams studied the records of courts in Inverness and found a model of "disciplined masculinity" which subsumed a previously more lawless and violent Highland culture. Campbell argued the research was flawed because of the difficulty of understand Highland society at that time without a knowledge of Gaelic.

In 2015, Abrams led a research project on the experiences of those who were rehoused in high rise flats in Glasgow in the 1960s and 1970s. The Housing, Everyday Life and Wellbeing team aimed to look at social history of public housing in Glasgow, focusing on 20th century social housing such as the Red Road high rise flats, rather than the tenement on which previous research had tended to focus.

In 2017, Abrams joined calls for public memorials to Scottish women accused of and executed for witchcraft between the 16th and 18th centuries, saying it reflected a wider dearth of visible monuments to Scottish women.

In 2018, Abrams was elected a Fellow of the British Academy, in recognition of her contribution to scholarship and research in the humanities.

References 

Year of birth missing (living people)
Living people
British historians
British women historians
Fellows of the British Academy
Academics of the University of Glasgow